Dwight Bennett Newton (January 14, 1916 – June 30, 2013) was an American writer of westerns. He also wrote under the names  Dwight Bennett, Clement Hardin, Ford Logan, Hank Mitchum and Dan Temple. Newton was one of the six founder members of the Western Writers of America. He was a writer and story consultant for various television shows including Wagon Train and Tales of Wells Fargo.

Biography
Newton was born in Kansas City, Missouri, and began to write short stories for Western magazines while studying history at the University of Missouri at Kansas City.  After graduating with a master's degree in 1942, he served in the Army Corps of Engineers until 1946, being based at Camp Abbot, a training center near Bend, Oregon, in 1943. After the war he settled in Bend, and became a professional writer, publishing 74 novels under various names, including one, Range Boss (Pocket Books, 1949), that was the first work of fiction issued in paperback, without having first appeared in hardcovers.

In 1952 Newton was one of the six founder members of Western Writers of America, Inc., serving as its first secretary-treasurer, and as a board member for ten years.

In the late 1950s, Newton moved to Hollywood to work as a writer and story consultant for several television shows, before returning to Bend in 1965.

During the 1970s, he gave classes in fiction writing at Central Oregon Community College, and at the Haystack summer school at Cannon Beach.

Personal life
Newton married Mary Jane Kregel of Nebraska City, Nebraska, on January 29, 1941. They had two daughters.

He died at his home in Bend, aged 97, and is buried at Tumalo Cemetery, Deschutes County, Oregon.

Bibliography

Novels
As "D. B. Newton"
Guns of the Rimrock, Phoenix Press (1946)
Range of No Return, Complete Western Book magazine (June 1949)
The Outlaw Breed, Gold Medal Books (1955)
Maverick Brand, Monarch Books (1962)
On the Dodge, Berkley (1962)
Guns of Warbonnet, Berkley (1963)
Bullets on the Wind, Berkley (1964)
Fury at Three Forks, Berkley (1964)
The Savage Hills, Berkley (1964)
The Manhunters, Berkley (1966)
Hideout Valley, Berkley (1967)
The Tabbart Brand, Berkley (1967)
Shotgun Freighter, Berkley (1968)
The Wolf Pack, Berkley (1968)
The Judas Horse, Berkley (1969)
Syndicate Gun, Berkley (1972)
Massacre Valley, Curtis Books (1973)
Range Tramp, Berkley (1973)
Bounty on Bannister, Berkley (1975)
The Landgrabbers, Popular Library (1975)
Trail of the Bear, Popular Library (1975)
Broken Spur, Berkley (1977)

As "Dwight Bennett"
Stormy Range, Doubleday & Co. (1951)
Border Graze, Doubleday & Co. (1953)
The Avenger, Permabooks (1956)
Cherokee Outlet, Doubleday & Co. (1961)
Rebel Trail, Doubleday & Co. (1963)
Crooked River Canyon, Doubleday & Co. (1966)
Legend in the Dust, Doubleday & Co. (1970)
The Big Land, Doubleday & Co. (1972)
The Guns of Ellsworth, Doubleday & Co. (1973)
Hangman's Knot, Doubleday & Co. (1975)
The Cheyenne Encounter, Doubleday & Co. (1976)
West of Railhead, Doubleday and Co. (1977)
The Texans, Doubleday & Co. (1979)
Disaster Creek, Doubleday & Co. (1981)

As "Ford Logan"
Fire in the Desert, Ballantine Books (1954)

As "Dan Temple"
Bullet Lease, Popular Library (1957)
Gun and Star, Monarch Books (1964)

As "Clement Hardin"
Cross Me in Gunsmoke, Ace Books (1957)
The Lurking Gun, Ace Books (1961)
Outcast of Ute Bend, Ace Books (1965)
The Ruthless Breed, Ace Books (1966)
The Oxbow Deed, Ace Books (1967)
The Paxman Feud, Ace Books (1967)
Ambush Reckoning, Ace Books (1968)
Sheriff of Sentinel, Ace Books (1969)
Colt Wages, Ace Books (1970)
Stage Line to Rincon, Ace Books (1971)
The Badge Shooters, Ace Books (1975)

As "Hank Mitchum"
Dodge City: Stagecoach Station #1, Bantam Books (1982)
Laredo: Stagecoach Station #2, Bantam Books (1982)
Santa Fe: Stagecoach Station #6, Bantam Books (1983)
Tombstone: Stagecoach Station #4, Bantam Books (1983)
Carson City: Stagecoach Station #13, Bantam Books (1984)
Deadwood: Stagecoach Station #11, Bantam Books (1984)
Leadville: Stagecoach Station #20, Bantam Books (1985)
Tulsa: Stagecoach Station #26, Bantam Books (1986)

Short stories
As "D. B. Newton"
"Swing High, Nester!", Lariat Story (March 1949)
"White Thunder of the Cherokees", Frontier Stories, (Summer 1949)
"Three Guns and a Girl", Best Western (September 1951)
"Rogue's Rendezvous", Rio Kid Western (January 1952)
"Stage Coach West", Frontier Stories (Spring 1952)
"The Slack Rein", Western Short Stories (June 1952)
"The Kid Who Wouldn't Talk", Best Western, (July 1952)
"The Kid That Satan Sent", Western Novels and Short Stories (April 1953)
"Mule Tracks", Bad Men and Good (WWA anthology), Dodd, Mead, (1953)
"Chain of Command", With Guidons Flying (WWA anthology), edited by Charles N. Heckelmann. Doubleday & Co., (1970) 
"The Storm Riders", Zane Grey Western (October 1970)

As "Dwight Bennett"
"Trail's End at the Hangtree", Five Western Novels (October 1951)

As "Jackson Cole"
"The Barbed Barrier", Texas Rangers (July 1953)

Teleplays
 Cimarron City
 "Kid on a Calico Horse". Teleplay by Dwight Newton and Thomas Thompson. Story by E. Jack Neuman (April 28, 1958)
 Colt .45
 "Under False Pretenses". Teleplay by Dwight Newton. Story by Elmer Kelton (October 3, 1959)
 Overland Trail
 "Daughter of the Sioux". Teleplay by Dwight Newton (January 6, 1960)
 Shotgun Slade
 "Mesa of Missing Men". Teleplay by Dwight Newton (June 19, 1959)
 "Barbed Wire". Teleplay by Frank Bonham and Dwight Newton (July 17, 1959)
 "Major Trouble". Teleplay by Bob Mitchell and Dwight Newton. Story by Ralph Conger (July 30, 1959)
 "Bob Ford". Teleplay by Tod Ballard and Dwight Newton (August 24, 1959)
Tales of Wells Fargo
 "The Hasty Gun". Teleplay by Dwight Newton (January 28, 1957)
 "Shotgun Messenger". Teleplay by Dwight Newton and Sloan Nibley (February 26, 1957)
 "Jesse James". Teleplay by Dwight Newton (March 5, 1957)
 "Ride With a Killer". Teleplay by Verne Athanas and Dwight Newton (March 19, 1957)
 "Fort Massacre". Teleplay by Dwight Newton and David Chandler. Story by David Chandler (April 8, 1957)
 "Luke Frazer". Teleplay by Dwight Newton. Story by T. T. Flynn (July 9, 1958)
 "The Branding Iron". Teleplay by A. I. Bezzerides and Dwight Newton (August 6, 1958)
 "Wild Cargo". Teleplay by Dwight Newton. Story by Steve Fisher (August 14, 1958)
 "The House I Enter". Teleplay by Dwight Newton. Story by William F. Leicester (October 31, 1958)
 "The Last Stand". Teleplay by Dwight Newton. Story by John Cunningham (November 21, 1958)
 "Tall Texan". Teleplay by D. D. Beauchamp, Mary Beauchamp and Dwight Newton (January 13, 1959)
 "Kid Curry". Teleplay by D. D. Beauchamp and Dwight Newton. Story by D. D. Beauchamp (March 6, 1959)
 "The Daltons". Teleplay by Dwight Newton (April 9, 1959)
 "The Dynamite Kid". Teleplay by Dwight Newton (September 1, 1959)
 "Frightened Witness". Teleplay by Dwight Newton and Barney Slater. Story by Dwight Newton (October 27, 1960)
Wagon Train
 "The Jesse Cowan Story". Story and teleplay by Dwight Newton (October 28, 1957)
 "The Bill Tawnee Story". Teleplay by Rik Vollaerts and Dwight Newton. Story by Rik Vollaerts (February 12, 1958) 
 Whiplash
 "Convict Town". By Dwight Newton (September 17, 1960)

Legacy
Nineteen linear feet of the author's papers are held at the University of Oregon Libraries, Special Collections and University Archives.

References

External links
 
 

1916 births
2013 deaths
People from Kansas City, Missouri
University of Missouri–Kansas City alumni
United States Army Corps of Engineers personnel
20th-century American novelists
American Western (genre) novelists
American television writers
American male television writers
20th-century American male writers
Screenwriters from Missouri